Jeffrey Thomas Brady  (born November 9, 1968) was an American football linebacker who played nine seasons in the National Football League (NFL) for eight different teams.  He played college football at the University of Kentucky.

1968 births
Living people
American football linebackers
Kentucky Wildcats football players
Pittsburgh Steelers players
Green Bay Packers players
San Diego Chargers players
Los Angeles Rams players
Tampa Bay Buccaneers players
Minnesota Vikings players
Carolina Panthers players
Indianapolis Colts players